The Montenegro Fault is an oblique sinistral strike-slip fault in the department of Quindío in west-central Colombia.

Etymology 
The fault is named after Montenegro, Quindío.

Description 

The  Montenegro Fault is part of the Romeral Fault System, running through the western slope of the Central Ranges. The fault is located to the west of the city of Armenia.

The fault deforms Quaternary volcanic debris flows and ash deposits. The Espejo River follows the strike of the Montenegro Fault.

See also 

 List of earthquakes in Colombia
 Armenia Fault

References

Bibliography

Maps

Further reading 
 

Seismic faults of Colombia
Strike-slip faults
Normal faults
Inactive faults
Faults